HMS Emerald was a 28-gun frigate of the Royal Navy which saw active service during the Seven Years' War.

She was renamed Emerald in December 1757 and commissioned into the Royal Navy in April 1758 under the command of Captain Thomas Cornwall.

Emerald was assigned to patrol and convoy duties in the British Leeward Islands from January 1759, securing three victories over French privateers in the following two years. In July 1760 command was transferred to Captain Charles Middleton, who remained with Emerald for the rest o her Caribbean service. The frigate returned to England in September 1761 and was decommissioned at Portsmouth Dockyard in October. She was declared surplus to Navy requirements on 7 October and broken up at Portsmouth Dockyard in November 1761.

References

Bibliography
 

Frigates of the Royal Navy
1744 ships
Captured ships